Lindtneria is a genus of fungi in the family Stephanosporaceae. , Index Fungorum accepts nine species in the genus. It is named after Serbian mycologist Vojteh Lindtner (1904–1965).

References

External links

Russulales
Russulales genera